Castelmola (Sicilian: Castermula) is a comune (municipality) in the Province of Messina in the Italian region Sicily, located about  east of Palermo and about  southwest of Messina.

Castelmola has ancient Greek origins. Situated above Taormina, it formerly served as its acropolis. In the last decades it has become a popular tourist destination. On Labour Day, which in Italy falls on 1 May, there is an annual music festival "Castelrock", held in the main square, which features live music performances by local musicians.
Castelmola was nominated as one of the most beautiful villages in Italy.

Castelmola borders the following municipalities: Gaggi, Letojanni, Mongiuffi Melia, Taormina.

Demographic evolution

References 

Cities and towns in Sicily